Cyclotropis is a genus of gastropods belonging to the family Assimineidae.

The species of this genus are found in Malesia and the coasts of Indian Ocean.

Species:

Cyclotropis bollingi 
Cyclotropis carinata 
Cyclotropis papuensis 
Cyclotropis rigens 
Cyclotropis terae

References

Gastropods